Labeobarbus tornieri is a species of ray-finned fish in the genus Labeobarbus is found in Cameroon, Equatorial Guinea, and Gabon.

References 

tornieri
Taxa named by Franz Steindachner
Fish described in 1906